

The Biblis Nuclear Power Plant is in the South Hessian municipality of Biblis and consists of two units: unit A with a gross output of 1200 megawatts and unit B with a gross output of 1300 megawatts. Both units are pressurized water reactors. The operator of this power plant is the German RWE Power AG, an electrical utility based in Essen.
Unit A began operation on July 16, 1974 and entered commercial service on August 25, 1974; unit B reached criticality on March 25, 1976. Both units now are shut down definitely for political reasons (Atomausstieg).

Biblis is the partner power station of the Balakovo Nuclear Power Plant.

Closure 

In March 2013, the administrative court for the German state of Hesse ruled that a three-month closure imposed by the government on the Biblis A and B reactors as an immediate response to the Fukushima accident was illegal. The state ministry of the environment acted illegally in March 2011, when an order was issued for the immediate closure of the Biblis units. RWE complied with the decree by shutting Biblis-A immediately, however as the plants were in compliance with the relevant safety requirements, the German government had no legal grounds for shutting them. The court ruled that the closure notice was illegal because RWE had not been given sufficient opportunity to respond to the order. Nevertheless, the units are now definitely shut down, based on the later political phaseout decision (Atomausstieg).

Incidents
On December 17, 1987 an incident (INES 1) occurred: Operators overlooked a stop valve that had not been closed. In order to close the armature a valve was opened. The radioactive primary cooling water discharged for a short time into the annular space. Because the discharge of the reactor cooling water took place outside of the reactor containment, there was potentially no feedback from the sump over the safety cooling pumps. The incident became public one year later, when an article in an American technical periodical (Nucleonic Weeks) was published.

There have been no other events higher than 0 on the INES scale.

See also

Anti-nuclear movement in Germany
Nuclear power in Germany
Vulnerability of nuclear plants to attack

Images

References

Former nuclear power stations in Germany
RWE
1969 establishments in West Germany
Economy of Hesse